The 1959 First 500 Mile NASCAR International Sweepstakes at Daytona (now known as the 1959 Inaugural Daytona 500) was the second race of the 1959 NASCAR Grand National Series season. It was held on February 22, 1959, in front of 41,921 spectators. It was the first race held at the 2.5-mile (4.0 kilometer) Daytona International Speedway.

Background 

Daytona International Speedway is a race track in Daytona Beach, Florida that was one of the first superspeedways to hold NASCAR races. The track also features two other layouts that utilize portions of the primary high speed tri-oval, such as a  sports car course and a  motorcycle course. The track's  infield includes the  Lake Lloyd. The speedway is currently owned and operated by the International Speedway Corporation.

The track was built by NASCAR founder Bill France, Sr. to host racing that was being held at the former Daytona Beach Road Course and opened with the first Daytona 500 in 1959.

The Daytona 500 is regarded as the most important and prestigious race on the NASCAR calendar. It is also the series' first race of the year; this phenomenon is virtually unique in sports, which tend to have championships or other major events at the end of the season rather than the start. Since 1995, U.S. television ratings for the Daytona 500 have been the highest for any auto race of the year, surpassing the traditional leader, the Indianapolis 500 which in turn greatly surpasses the Daytona 500 in in-track attendance and international viewing. The 2006 Daytona 500 attracted the sixth largest average live global TV audience of any sporting event that year with 20 million viewers.

Race report

Qualifying
The race had one qualifying race for Convertibles and one for the hardtop Grand National cars. Bob Welborn, winner of the  Grand National qualifying race earlier in the week, started on the pole position. Shorty Rollins won the Convertible qualifying race and started second. Twenty of the 59 cars in the Daytona 500 were convertibles.

Race
There were no caution periods in the race; making it one of the few "perfect games" in NASCAR history, though it would occur in three of the first four Daytona 500s, as the Daytona 500 also went caution-free in both 1961 and 1962. This would be repeated ten years later with the 1969 running of the Motor Trend 500. Welborn led the early laps in the race but his race ended after 75 laps (of 200) with engine problems. Other leaders in the first 22 laps of the race were "Tiger" Tom Pistone and Joe Weatherly. Fireball Roberts took over the lead on lap 23, leading the next 20 laps before dropping out on lap 57 due to a broken fuel pump. When Roberts went to the pits on lap 43, Johnny Beauchamp, running in second place, became the leader. On lap 50, Pistone took over first place and Jack Smith moved into second; Beauchamp was third and Lee Petty was fifth. From lap 43 to 148 the race leaders were Pistone, Smith, and Beauchamp. Although Smith and Pistone led most of these laps, Beauchamp led a few times, for example records show he led on lap 110. There is print information about the details of the race, including the leaders of the race in five-lap intervals. Pistone and Jack Smith both had dropped out of contention by lap 149 and Beauchamp took over first place. . Richard Petty also had to retire from the race with an engine problem and earned $100 ($ when adjusted for inflation) for his 57th-place performance.

Lee Petty battled with Beauchamp during the final 30 laps of the race, and they were the only two drivers to finish on the lead lap. Petty took the lead with 3 laps left and led at the start of the final lap. Petty and Beauchamp drove side by side across the finish line at the end final lap for a photo finish. Beauchamp was declared the unofficial winner by NASCAR officials, and he drove to victory lane. Petty protested the results, saying "I had Beauchamp by a good two feet. In my own mind, I know I won." Beauchamp replied "I had him by two feet. I glanced over to Lee Petty's car as I crossed the finish line and I could see his headlight slightly back of my car. It was so close I didn't know how they would call it, but I thought I won." Early leader Fireball Roberts, who was standing by the finish line, said: "There's no doubt about it, Petty won." It took NASCAR founder Bill France, Sr. three days to decide the winner the following Wednesday. In the end, with the help of photographs and newsreel footage, Petty was officially declared the winner.

The controversial finish helped the sport. The delayed results to determine the official winner kept NASCAR and the Daytona 500 on the front page of newspapers.

Official results
The race lasted 3:41:22, with an average speed of 135.521 mph (218.10 km/h).

References

External links

Daytona 500
Daytona 500
February 1959 sports events in the United States
NASCAR races at Daytona International Speedway
NASCAR controversies